The 1977 Australian Sports Car Championship was a CAMS sanctioned motor racing competition for drivers of Group D Production Sports Cars. It was the ninth Australian Sports Car Championship to be awarded by CAMS.

Calendar
The championship was contested over a six-round series.
 Round 1, Calder, Victoria, January
 Round 2, Adelaide International Raceway, South Australia, 3 April
 Round 3, Amaroo Park, New South Wales, 29 May
 Round 4, Lakeside, Queensland
 Round 5, Oran Park, New South Wales, 30 October
 Round 6, Phillip Island, Victoria, 20 November

Classes
Cars competed in two engine capacity classes.
 Up to and including 2000cc
 Over 2000cc

Results

Note: Hamilton achieved four round wins to Latham's one, however there was no countback process incorporated in the points system to act as a tiebreaker, so the two drivers shared the title.

References

External links
 1977 Australian Sports Car racing images at www.autopics.com.au

Australian Sports Car Championship
Sports Car Championship